Christine Strübing (born 30 March 1952) was an East German swimmer. She competed at the 1968 Summer Olympics in the 100 m and 200 m butterfly events, but failed to reach the finals.

References

1952 births
Living people
German female swimmers
Sportspeople from Rostock
Olympic swimmers of East Germany
Swimmers at the 1968 Summer Olympics
Female butterfly swimmers